Jari Jukka Hannu Koskela is a Finnish politician currently serving in the Parliament of Finland for the Finns Party at the Satakunta constituency. He is a Pastor and Doctor of Social Science.

References

Living people
Members of the Parliament of Finland (2019–23)
Finns Party politicians
21st-century Finnish politicians
Year of birth missing (living people)